Askwith is a village and civil parish in the Harrogate district of North Yorkshire, England, with a population of 220 (2001 census), increasing to 240 at the 2011 Census.  The village is located in Wharfedale, and is close to the border of West Yorkshire. Nearby towns are Otley, Ilkley and Burley-in-Wharfedale. Facilities include a school, a pub, and a garden nursery.

An annual show is held, with attractions ranging from produce and handicraft classes, to a dog show and horse competitions, as well as stalls and entertainment. There is also a WI group and a toddler group.

Baines lists the village as "Asquith" in 1822 and Lewis as "Askwith, or Asquith" in 1848. A derivative surname from the village is that of Asquith.

The village is related to the famous Asquith family.

Askwith Community Primary School
The school has around 80 pupils and is constantly rated as "outstanding" in Ofsted reports.

References

External links 

Villages in North Yorkshire
Civil parishes in North Yorkshire
Wharfedale